Sam Pittman (born November 28, 1961) is an American football coach who is the head football coach at the University of Arkansas. Prior to being hired at Arkansas, he was the associate head coach and offensive line coach at the University of Georgia. Prior to his hiring at Arkansas, Pittman spent almost his entire career, going back to the mid-1990s, as an offensive line coach at various college football programs. He also became known as one of the country’s top recruiters.

Playing career
Pittman was born in El Reno, Oklahoma. His father, Don, moved the family to Grove, Oklahoma because Grove High School had better recruiting prospects. Pittman, a multi-sport athlete in high school, attended Pittsburg State University in Pittsburg, Kansas. He played defensive end at Pittsburg State from 1980 to 1983 and in his senior year was named a National Association of Intercollegiate Athletics (NAIA) All-American. Pittsburg State inducted him into their Athletic Hall of Fame in 1998.

In 1981, Pittman's sophomore year, Pittsburg State went 10–2 and lost the NAIA Division I Championship. Head coach Ron Randleman parlayed this success into the head coaching job at Sam Houston State University. His successor at Pittsburg State was defensive coordinator Bruce Polen, who had recruited Pittman in high school. Pittman accompanied Polen on several recruiting trips while still a student; in 2020 Polen would reflect on Pittman's natural affinity for recruiting:

Coaching career

High school

Following his graduation from Pittsburg State, Pittman spent two years there as a student assistant coach before becoming offensive coordinator at Beggs High School in Beggs, Oklahoma, for the 1986 season. Following that stint Pittman served as head coach for Princeton Junior-Senior High School in Princeton, Missouri, from 1987 to 1988, and Trenton High School in Trenton, Missouri, from 1989 to 1990.

College assistant
In 1991, Pittman was hired as the offensive line coach at Hutchinson Community College in Hutchinson, Kansas. The following year he was named head coach, replacing Glenn Percy. Pittman compiled an 11–9–1 record over two seasons. Pittman was credited with reviving a "struggling" program. Northern Illinois hired Pittman as its offensive line coach in February 1994. Then-head coach Charlie Sadler described Pittman as "one of the top up-and-coming offensive line coaches in the country." Sadler was fired after the 1995 season, and Pittman moved over to the University of Cincinnati, joining Rick Minter's staff as tight ends coach. Other coaches on that staff included future NFL head coaches Rex Ryan (defensive coordinator) and John Harbaugh (assistant head coach).

Pittman left Cincinnati after the 1996 season to become the offensive line coach at the University of Oklahoma under second-year coach John Blake. Rex Ryan followed Pittman to Oklahoma after Blake reshuffled his coaching staff at the end of the 1997 season. Oklahoma fired Blake after the 1998 season and Pittman moved over to Western Michigan University to join Gary Darnell's staff, again as offensive line coach. At the end of 1999 Pittman and offensive coordinator Bill Cubit departed Western Michigan to take up the same positions at the University of Missouri under Larry Smith. Missouri fired Smith at the end of the 2000 season; Pittman moved over to the University of Kansas under Terry Allen. Allen had reshuffled his coaching staff following a disappointing 4–7 season in 2000; in 2001 team went 3–8 and Allen was fired.

Pittman returned to the coaching ranks in 2003 as the offensive line coach at Northern Illinois, the same job he had held in 1994–1995. The head coach was Joe Novak, who had replaced the fired Sadler after the 1995 season. Northern Illinois promoted Pittman to assistant head coach for the 2004 season. Pittman departed Northern Illinois after the 2006 season to join new University of North Carolina head coach Butch Davis' staff as offensive line coach. Pittman was considered a potential head coach at Northern Illinois after Jerry Kill, Novak's successor, departed for the University of Minnesota after the 2010 season. Davis was dismissed before the 2011 because of an academic scandal; Pittman was considered for the interim head coach job which eventually went to Everett Withers.

After the 2011 season, Pittman took the offensive line coach job at the University of Tennessee under Derek Dooley. This was not the first time Pittman was added to a coaching staff just reshuffled because of poor performance. Tennessee fired Dooley at the end of season, and Pittman joined new University of Arkansas head coach Bret Bielema's staff as assistant head coach/offensive line coach, where he spent the 2013 through 2015 seasons. During his time at Arkansas, Pittman fielded some of the best offensive lines in college football, including the biggest line in all of football in 2015, to include the NFL. His lines paved the way for two different running backs, Jonathan Williams and Alex Collins, to rush for over 1,000 yards during his three years as the O-Line position coach. 

Pittman departed Arkansas after the 2015 season to become offensive line coach at the University of Georgia under new head coach Kirby Smart and offensive coordinator Jim Chaney, with whom Pittman had previously worked at Tennessee and Arkansas. Georgia paid a $250,000 buyout to hire Pittman. When Pittman informed Bielema that he planned to take the Georgia job, Bielema brought several Arkansas offensive linemen to Pittman's house to attempt to convince him to remain at Arkansas. Bielema claimed that Pittman had refused to meet personally with his players to inform them he would be leaving, a claim that Pittman denied.

At Georgia, Pittman garnered a reputation as "one of the best recruiters and offensive line coaches in the SEC." In his second season, Georgia won the SEC Championship Game and reached the College Football Playoff National Championship. That was the first of three consecutive Southeastern Conference East Division titles for Georgia from 2017 to 2019. Pittman's 2018 line was named a finalist for the Joe Moore Award for the best offensive line in college football. Pittman was promoted to associate head coach in 2019, with a salary of $900,000 per year making him the highest-paid offensive line coach in the NCAA Division I Football Bowl Subdivision. Off the field, he became known for a catchphrase, "Yesssirrrr!", that he would use in social-media videos posted after Georgia secured commitments from significant recruits, beginning with quarterback Justin Fields in 2017.

Head coach
On December 8, 2019, Pittman was announced as the new head coach at Arkansas, replacing Chad Morris, who was fired midway through his second season. Other candidates for the position reportedly included Lane Kiffin and Mike Leach. Several of Pittman's former players lobbied for him to get the job, including writing an open letter to Arkansas administrators shortly after Morris's firing. Pittman's hiring was announced on Twitter by athletic director Hunter Yurachek, including a video of Pittman and Yurachek bellowing Pittman's trademark ""Yesssirrrr!" 

His first season as head coach proved a successful one, with the Razorbacks finishing 3-7 in an all-SEC schedule and snapping a 20-game SEC losing streak with a win over Mississippi State. Arkansas received an invite to the Texas Bowl to play TCU, however the game was eventually cancelled due to COVID-19 issues in the Horned Frogs’ program. 

In his second season as head coach for Arkansas in 2021, Pittman led the Razorbacks to an 9-4 record, finishing 4-4 in SEC play; good enough to tie for third place in the West Division. It was only the second time in 10 years that Arkansas had won as many as eight games in a season. The season included a victory over the Texas Longhorns, breaking a nine game losing streak to the Texas A&M Aggies, and breaking five game losing streaks to the LSU Tigers and Missouri Tigers. 2021 marked the first time in school history that Arkansas won all three trophy rivalry games in the same season, winning the Southwest Classic trophy, the Golden Boot Trophy, and the Battle Line Rivalry Trophy over A&M, LSU, and Missouri, respectively. After a five year bowl drought, the Razorbacks were selected to play in the 2022 Outback Bowl against the Penn State Nittany Lions, which they won 24-10, giving Arkansas their first bowl victory since 2015, and their first New Year's Day bowl victory since 2000. It was also Arkansas' first bowl victory over a Big Ten team. QB K.J. Jefferson was named the bowl game MVP. Pittman was named the AFCA Region 2 Coach of the Year.

In his third year as head coach in 2022, the Razorbacks started the season ranked No. 19 in the AP poll, despite losing wide receiver Treylon Burks in the first round of the 2022 NFL Draft. They rose to No. 16 after a 31-24 win over No. 23 Cincinnati, then rose to No. 10 after a 44-30 win over South Carolina. Then, they faced No. 5 (FCS) Missouri State, which was led by former Arkansas head coach Bobby Petrino. In a game in which they did not lead until the 4th quarter, they won 38-27 and remained No. 10 in the next poll. After a 21-23 loss to No. 23 Texas A&M that ended on a missed field goal, they dropped to No. 20, then dropped out completely after a 26-49 loss to No. 2 Alabama, which marked their 16th consecutive loss to the Crimson Tide. The next week, they suffered a 17-40 loss to No. 23 Mississippi State in a game where starting quarterback KJ Jefferson was out with a concussion. They ended their losing streak the next week with a 52-35 win over BYU. After a bye week, they defeated Auburn 41-27 in the last game before the Tigers fired head coach Bryan Harsin just two days later. However, they lost 19-21 to Liberty the next week in a game where Jefferson was not 100% healthy, and that ended on a missed two-point conversion and a failed onside kick. Then, they faced No. 7 LSU in a game where Jefferson was out with a shoulder and clavicle injury and two other players were suspended after being arrested for disorderly conduct. In a close game, the Razorbacks lost 10-13 after backup quarterback Cade Fortin fumbled the ball at the end of the game. They followed this with a 42-27 upset win over No. 14 Ole Miss that saw Jefferson return and play well, but lost the last game of the season to Missouri 27-29. The Razorbacks lost four games (A&M, Liberty, LSU, Missouri) by a total of 9 points and finished the regular season with a disappointing 6-6 record. Arkansas would beat Kansas 55-53 in triple overtime in the 2022 Liberty Bowl to improve their overall record to 7-6. Jefferson was named the Liberty Bowl MVP. 

After the 2022 season, Pittman fired strength and conditioning coach Jamil Walker, while defensive backs coach Dominique Bowman and Arkansas mutually parted ways, with Bowman ending up as the DB coach at Temple. Pittman also lost other assistant coaches after the season, to include offensive coordinator Kendal Briles to the same position at TCU, defensive coordinator Barry Odom who became the new head coach at UNLV, tight ends coach Dowell Loggains became the OC at South Carolina, and linebackers coach Michael Scherer followed Odom to UNLV to be the DC. Pittman welcomed new coaches Dan Enos as OC, Travis Williams as DC and LB coach, Marcus Woodson as co-DC and safeties coach, Morgan Turner as TE coach, Deron Wilson as DB coach, and Ben Sowders as the new strength and conditioning coach.

Personal life
Sam is married to his wife, Jamie. They have no children. Pittman is close friends with his former colleague Rex Ryan. Ryan (who according to Pittman is "not handy") once flew Pittman out to his home to help build a children's fort that Ryan had designed:

Head coaching record

Junior college

College

Notes

References

External links
 Arkansas Razorbacks bio

1961 births
Living people
Arkansas Razorbacks football coaches
Cincinnati Bearcats football coaches
Georgia Bulldogs football coaches
Hutchinson Blue Dragons football coaches
Kansas Jayhawks football coaches
Missouri Tigers football coaches
North Carolina Tar Heels football coaches
Northern Illinois Huskies football coaches
Oklahoma Sooners football coaches
Pittsburg State Gorillas football coaches
Pittsburg State Gorillas football players
Tennessee Volunteers football coaches
Western Michigan Broncos football coaches
High school football coaches in Missouri
High school football coaches in Oklahoma
People from El Reno, Oklahoma
People from Grove, Oklahoma
Coaches of American football from Oklahoma
Players of American football from Oklahoma